Cuitláhuac is a municipality in the Mexican state of Veracruz. It is named after Cuitláhuac, the 10th tlatoani (ruler) of the Aztec city of Tenochtitlan for 80 days during the year Two Flint (1520).

Notable people 

Ricardo Rincón (born 1970), baseball player

References

External links 

  Municipal Official Site
  Municipal Official Information

Municipalities of Veracruz